Level 9 is an American science-fiction television series created by Michael Connelly and Josh Meyer that was broadcast on UPN from October 27, 2000 until January 26, 2001.

Plot
The series revolved around a secret agency within the government, staffed by government agents, tech-savvy geeks, and former criminal hackers, which is tasked with solving or preventing cyber crimes.

Cast
 Fabrizio Filippo as Roland Travis, a former criminal hacker given a choice between prison and joining Level 9.
 Kate Hodge as Annie Price, the Level 9 team leader and a former FBI agent.
 Michael Joseph Kelly as Wilbert "Tibbs" Thibodeaux
 Romany Malco as Jerry Hooten, formerly with the United States Postal Inspection Service.
 Max Martini as Jack Wiley, an agent with the Defense Intelligence Agency (DIA), a former army ranger who studied cyber-ops before joining the team in the second episode.
 Kim Murphy as Margaret "Sosh" Perkins, born June 9, 1972, she was an internet model before she got into anti-cyber-crime.
 Susie Park as Joss Nakano
 Esteban Powell as Jargon, a few years ago he quit his high-school hacking club when they started getting into criminal hacking.
 Tim Guinee as Det. John Burrows, he works closely with Level 9 in first episode, but did not return. (Max Martini's character filling the same general role)
 Willie Garson as Bones, an expert on internet privacy and "big brother" who helps the team in the first two episodes.
 Miguel Sandoval as Santoro Goff, the agency director in Washington D.C. with oversight of Level 9.

Production
Thirteen episodes were produced, ten of which were aired on UPN, before the program was canceled in January 2001 due to low ratings.

Episodes

Broadcast and syndication
In August 2006, the Sci-Fi Channel acquired rerun rights to the series which was added to their schedule in June 2007. Sci-Fi aired the episodes never shown by UPN in February 2008.

Home media
On May 11, 2018, Visual Entertainment released Level 9- The Complete Series on DVD in Region 1.

References

External links
 
 

2000s American crime drama television series
2000 American television series debuts
2001 American television series endings
Television series by CBS Studios
UPN original programming
2000s American science fiction television series